Río Roma are a Mexican Latin pop duo. It consists of brothers José Luis Ortega Castro (born January 17, 1981) and Raúl Ortega Castro (born July 17, 1984).

José Luis is also a prolific songwriter. Famous singers who had recorded songs written by him include: Ha*Ash, María José, Alejandro Fernández, Yuridia, Camila, Alejandra Guzmán and Pandora, among others.

They chose "Río Roma" as their name because of how it sounds and it reads "Oír Amor" (hearing love)  backwards.

Biography

From 1997 until 2002, José Luis was member of Mexican boy band Ciao Mama, with whom he recorded two albums: "Ciao Mama" in 1999, and "Puntos Suspensivos..." in 2001, both under EMI Music México.

In 2008 José Luis and Raúl recorded a Norteño album with their first names. They started as Río Roma in 2011.

Discography

As José y Raúl
José y Raúl (2008)

As Río Roma
Al Fin Te Encontré (2011)
Otra Vida (2013) 
Eres La Persona Correcta En El Momento Equivocado (2016)
Rojo (2021)

References

External links
 RíoRoma.Mx — Río Roma official website

Mexican pop music groups
Sony Music Latin artists
Sony Music Mexico artists
Sibling musical duos
Latin pop music groups
Mexican musical duos